The 1936–37 Cincinnati Bearcats men's basketball team represented the University of Cincinnati during the 1936–37 NCAA men's basketball season. The head coach was Tay Brown, coaching his fourth season with the Bearcats. The team finished with an overall record of 9–10.

Schedule

|-

References

Cincinnati Bearcats men's basketball seasons
Cincinnati
Cincinnati Bearcats men's basketball team
Cincinnati Bearcats men's basketball team